Michalis Kasapis (born 6 June 1971) is a Greek former professional footballer who played as a left back and a later manager. In 1995 he was voted as the second best Greek footballer and as one of the 22 best European players in 2001–02, he played in the Europe XI after he was called by the Johan Cruyff and he is considered one of the best Greek left backs to ever play the game.

Club career
Kasapis started his career in 1988, playing for Levadiakos. He played five seasons for the club of Livadeia, where he became the captain of Greece U19, before earning a transfer to AEK Athens in the summer of 1993 for 50 million drachmas. In his first season at AEK, he played as a left midfielder, being the only youngster of the roster that Bajević used as a starter and the very next season he played to a left back, where and established himself for the rest of his career. Speed, endurance, spirited play, good crosses and excellent balance in defensive and offensive tasks, were his main characteristics. For a number of years, he had an amazing partnership with Toni Savevski, on the left flank of the team. One of the worst moments in his career was his devastating punishment on 5 November 1999, when in a home match Olympiacos he attacked the match referee Dimitropoulos, in a match that AEK had huge complaints from the referee and was punished for 24 games. After these events he announced his departure from the national team alongside Nikolaidis and Atmatsidis, as a protest against refereeing in Greek football. An important goal of his career was the beautiful goal in November 1997 at a cup match against Olympiacos in Nikos Goumas Stadium, in a year when AEK also won the trophy. The greates moment of Kasapis' career was the call by Johan Cruyff to the Europe XI on 7 November 1995 at the Camp Nou, when in a match for charity where he played with footballers such as Maradona, Romário, Stoichkov and Zubizarreta. Kasapis is the first AEK footballer in appearances in European competitions having played 67 times. As a member of AEK he won 1 championship, 4 cups and 1 Super Cup and at times he was also their captain. In the summer of 2004, he ended his football career, after the difficulties in the administrative and financial situation of the club.

International career
Kasapis got 36 caps for Greece between 27 April 1994 and 2002. In 1999 he withdrew the national team with Demis Nikolaidis and Ilias Atmatsidis, as a protest for refereeing situation that prevailed at the time in Greece. Finally in 2001 he was convinced by the then coach Otto Rehhagel to return to the national team.

After football
He started in 2006 as the coach of the youth team of Levadeakos and continued in 2009 at Fokikos for one season, the following season at AEL Kalloni, to return in February 2011 again to the Amfissa team. In February 2013 he assumed the technical leadership of AO Chalkida. On 5 September 2013 Kasapis returned to the AEK as scout and tactical analyst until July 2021.

Honours

AEK Athens 
Alpha Ethniki: 1993–94
Greek Cup: 1995–96, 1996–97, 1999–2000, 2001–02
Greek Super Cup: 1996

References

External links

Profile at Onsports.gr

1971 births
Living people
Greece international footballers
Association football fullbacks
Super League Greece players
AEK Athens F.C. players
Levadiakos F.C. players
Greek football managers
AEK F.C. non-playing staff
Footballers from Athens
Greek footballers